New Bulgarian University (also known and abbreviated as НБУ, NBU) is a private university based in Sofia, the capital of Bulgaria. Its campus is in the western district of the city, known for its proximity to the Vitosha nature park. The university also owns multiple other buildings across the country, as well as its own publishing house and a library.

Among the list of NBU Honorary Doctors and Honorary Professors are Richard Rorty, Thomas Sebeok, Wolfgang Iser, Terry Eagleton, Julia Kristeva, Jean-Pierre Vernant, Ralf Dahrendorf, Steve Forbes, Geert Hofstede, Ennio Morricone, Milcho Leviev, Raina Kabaivanska,  Alexander Fol, Vera Mutafchieva, Georgy Fotev etc.

The mission of New Bulgarian University is to:

- be an autonomous academic institution that supports students in their entrepreneurial and personal development.

- be a liberal academic institution, based on the link between education, research and entrepreneurship.

- provide interdisciplinary general and specialised education, based on theoretical research and practical knowledge.

Since 2004, NBU is an accredited partner of The Open University Business School.

History
NBU was established on 18 September 1991 by Bogdan Bogdanov and a group of Bulgarian intellectuals with a resolution by Bulgarian Parliament. NBU's main purpose was to modernise Bulgarian higher education. 2,500 students were welcomed during the first year. A test of general education was introduced in 1995 and established as a uniform standard for the reception of students in 1996.

NBU's Educational Museum was founded on 23 April 2010. The first exhibition was "Museum Network Resources". It was the final stage of the project "Educational Museum at New Bulgarian University". The project was funded by the National Fund for Research at the Ministry of Education, Youth and Science, the Cultural Heritage (study on national historic and culture legacy as a part of European culture heritage and advanced methods for preserving).

Since 2010, NBU is the home of 'The Slug Theater', where the university's drama club present their shows.

Campus facilities

The campus consists of two buildings (Buildings 1 and 2) housing the Aula, Library, University Theater, NBU Museum, UniArt Gallery, Medical Center, and a Sports Center surrounded with open green spaces.

The university has more than 100 halls, computer labs, language and simultaneous interpreting labs, a Mock Courtroom, an Arts Center with practice rooms and studios for students of music, fine arts, design and architecture with a total capacity of 2 500 seats.

Library
NBU's academic library provides over 128 000 items accessed by 150 000 annual visitors.

Reputation 
NBU's IT and management departments rank high in the country. As of 2014, NBU ranked second in Bulgaria according to the Webometrics Ranking of World Universities.

Centers

Central and East European Center for Cognitive Science
The Central and East European Center for Cognitive Science (or CEEC of Cognitive Science) undertakes research in fundamental and applied cognitive science. Research topics include: memory, thinking, language, learning, perception, context, applications to robotics, AI, and cognitive systems, cognitive economics, human factors and usability, education and learning methods. The Center is co-directed by Boicho Kokinov and Jeff Elman.

The CEEC of Cognitive Science grants M.Sc., Ph.D. degrees in cognitive science and organizes annually summer school.

Other centers
 Bulgarian Center for Human relations
 Center for Social Practices
 Center for Public Administration
 Assessment Center
 South-East European Center for Semiotic Studies

Departments 

 National and International Security Studies
 Anthropology
 Archaeology
 Biomedical Sciences
 Cinema, Advertising and Show Business
 Cognitive science and Psychology
 Architecture
 Design
 Earth and Environmental Sciences
 Economics and Business Administration
 Fine Arts
 Foreign Language Education
 Foreign Languages and Literatures
 History
 Informatics

 History of Culture
 Law
 Mass Communications
 Mediterranean and Eastern Studies
 Musical Arts
 New Bulgarian Studies
 Philosophy and Sociology
 Plastic Arts
 Political Sciences
 Theater
 Telecommunications
 Tourism

Programmes

Bachelor's

See also
 Bulgarian Virtual University
 Central and East European Center for Cognitive Science

References

External links
 New Bulgarian University official website
 South Eastern European Center for Semiotic Studies
 Efficiency and public funding for higher education in Bulgaria

Educational institutions established in 1991
1991 establishments in Bulgaria